Baa Nalle Madhuchandrake is a 1993 Indian Kannada-language romantic thriller film, starring K. Shivram and Nandini Singh. The film was directed and written by Nagathihalli Chandrashekar, based on his novel of the same name. It is produced by Urmila Babu for Drishya Kavya Films banner. The film's soundtrack is composed by Hamsalekha.

Plot
Vivek is a writer and gets engaged to a beautiful girl, Preethi. He is madly in love with her and cannot live without her. Days after marriage, the couple travel to Shimla on their honeymoon. Preethi falls from a cliff and dies. Shattered and shocked, Vivek returns home. He becomes totally distraught in life and starts drinking heavily. His friend consoles him every time.

Meanwhile, a police officer arrives from Shimla to investigate the case. He sympathizes with the grief-stricken Vivek and also suspects him. He stays for a long time and does his investigation. Not finding any clues to move forward in the case, he concludes the death was an accident. When returning to Shimla, Vivek meets him at the railway station and says goodbye. The train is delayed and he makes an inquiry in the railway department. Ticket counter guy informed Vivek did booked only 1 ticket while return journey. Police officer gets shocked and chases vivek and asked to surrender. Vivek told reason to killed Preethi and surrendered.

Cast

 K. Shivram as Vivek
 Nandini Singh as Preethi
 Prakash Rai as David
 Sundar Raj as Bus Driver in Mysuru University
 Karibasavaiah as Beggar in Train
 Tennis Krishna in special appearance
 Nagathihalli Chandrashekar in special appearance as Police Inspector in Mysuru
 Padma Kumta as Preethi's Mother
 H. G. Dattatreya as Vivek's Father
 Ashok Rao as Special Police Officer from Shimla
 Maanu as Preethi's Father
 Bhargavi Narayan as Vivek's Mother

Soundtrack
All the songs were composed and scored by Hamsalekha. The soundtrack was received with positive response and the songs gets aired on FM channels.

References

1993 films
1990s Kannada-language films
1990s romantic thriller films
Films based on Indian novels
Films scored by Hamsalekha
Indian romantic thriller films
Films directed by Nagathihalli Chandrashekhar